Jackson County is a county located in the U.S. state of Colorado. As of the 2020 census, the population was 1,379, and it was the fourth least populated in the state. The county is named after the United States President Andrew Jackson. The county seat and only municipality in the county is Walden.

History
This basin opens north into Wyoming and is rimmed on the west by the Park Range and Sierra Madre Range, on the south by the Rabbit Ears Range and the Never Summer Mountains, and on the east by the Medicine Bow Mountains. The term park is derived from parc, the French word for game preserve. At one time North Park was filled with herds of deer, antelope and buffalo. There were so many buffalo in the area the Ute Tribe gave North Park the name "Bull Pen." Now deer, elk, and cattle vie for the same area.

In November 1861, Colorado set up 17 counties for the state, including Larimer County.  This was where Jackson County would be carved out of in 1909. Before then, both Grand and Larimer Counties claimed the North Park area.  In the beginning, no one paid much attention to North Park because it was hunting grounds of the Ute and Arapaho Indians. They fiercely defended these lands and the white settlers were often afraid to venture in.  When valuable minerals were discovered in North Park, Grand County claimed it as part of their county because they wanted the revenue it would provide.  The residents didn't care much because the county seat for Grand County was closer than the one in Larimer County, and all official business needed to be done at the county seat.  But Larimer also claimed this county and it was contested all the way to the Colorado Supreme Court.  In 1886 the court decided in favor of Larimer.  This did not make the North Park residents very happy and they pushed for their own county until Jackson was formed.

Geography

Jackson County contains the  Colorado State Forest.

Adjacent counties
Albany County, Wyoming - northeast
Larimer County - east
Grand County - south
Routt County - west
Carbon County, Wyoming - northwest

Major Highways
  U.S. Highway 40
  State Highway 14
  State Highway 125
  State Highway 127

Airport

Jackson County Airport

Jackson County Airport Info

Demographics

As of the census of 2000, there were 1,577 people, 661 households, and 442 families living in the county.  The population density was 1 person per square mile (0.25/km2).  There were 1,145 housing units at an average density of 1 per square mile (0/km2).  The racial makeup of the county was 96.20% White, 0.25% Black or African American, 0.76% Native American, 0.06% Asian, 1.46% from other races, and 1.27% from two or more races.  6.53% of the population were Hispanic or Latino of any race.

There were 661 households, out of which 29.20% had children under the age of 18 living with them, 54.90% were married couples living together, 7.90% had a female householder with no husband present, and 33.00% were non-families. 28.40% of all households were made up of individuals, and 10.10% had someone living alone who was 65 years of age or older.  The average household size was 2.37 and the average family size was 2.91.

In the county, the population was spread out, with 25.60% under the age of 18, 5.40% from 18 to 24, 26.90% from 25 to 44, 29.10% from 45 to 64, and 13.10% who were 65 years of age or older.  The median age was 40 years. For every 100 females there were 101.40 males.  For every 100 females age 18 and over, there were 107.80 males.

The median income for a household in the county was $31,821, and the median income for a family was $37,361. Males had a median income of $26,250 versus $18,417 for females. The per capita income for the county was $17,826.  About 10.30% of families and 14.00% of the population were below the poverty line, including 22.50% of those under age 18 and 9.00% of those age 65 or over.

Politics

Recreation

State forest and park
Colorado State Forest
State Forest State Park

National wildlife refuge
Arapaho National Wildlife Refuge

National forest and wilderness
Routt National Forest
Mount Zirkel Wilderness
Never Summer Wilderness
Platte River Wilderness

National trail
Continental Divide National Scenic Trail

Bicycle routes
Great Parks Bicycle Route
TransAmerica Trail Bicycle Route

Scenic byway
Cache la Poudre-North Park Scenic Byway

Communities

Town
Walden

Unincorporated communities
Coalmont
Cowdrey
Gould
Rand

Former Towns
Brownlee
Hebron
Old Homestead
Owl
Pearl
Spicer
Teller City
Zirkel

See also

Outline of Colorado
Index of Colorado-related articles
North County, Jefferson Territory
National Register of Historic Places listings in Jackson County, Colorado

References

External links
Jackson County Government Website
Colorado County Evolution by Don Stanwyck
Colorado Historical Society

 
Colorado counties
1909 establishments in Colorado
Populated places established in 1909